Jack Rutherford may refer to:

Jack Rutherford (cricketer) (1929–2022), Australian cricketer
Jack Rutherford (footballer, born 1892) (1892–1930), English footballer for Brighton & Hove Albion, Bristol Rovers and Gillingham
Jack Rutherford (footballer, born 1908), English footballer for Gillingham and Watford 
Jack Rutherford (actor) (1893–1982), British film and television actor
Jock Rutherford (1884–1963), English footballer sometimes known as Jack or Jackie

See also
John Rutherford (disambiguation)